Joseph Armand Leo Bourgault (January 17, 1903 - July 14, 1978) was a Canadian professional ice hockey player. He played in the National Hockey League with four teams between 1926 and 1935. He was born in Sturgeon Falls, Ontario.

Playing career
Bourgault started his National Hockey League career with the Toronto Maple Leafs in 1926. He also played for the New York Rangers, Ottawa Senators, and Montreal Canadiens. He left the NHL after the 1934 season. He played 2 more seasons in the CAHL before retiring from hockey after the 1936 season. He won the Stanley Cup in 1928 with the New York Rangers. He is one of six NHL players to have worn the number 99. His name is sometimes written "Bourgeault" by mistake.

Career statistics

Regular season and playoffs

References

External links
 

1903 births
1978 deaths
Bronx Tigers players
Canadian expatriate ice hockey players in the United States
Canadian ice hockey defencemen
Franco-Ontarian people
Guelph Royals players
Ice hockey people from Ontario
Montreal Canadiens players
New York Rangers players
Ontario Hockey Association Senior A League (1890–1979) players
Ottawa Senators (1917) players
People from West Nipissing
Quebec Castors players
Saskatoon Sheiks players
Springfield Indians (NAHL) players
Stanley Cup champions
Toronto Maple Leafs players
Toronto St. Pats players